This is a list of manga magazines or  published in Japan. The majority of manga magazines are categorized into one of five demographics, which correspond to the age and gender of their readership:

 Kodomo – aimed at young children.
 Shōnen – aimed at boys. 
 Shōjo – aimed at girls. 
 Seinen – aimed at young adult men.
 Josei – aimed at young adult women.

Some entries are listed as "Mixed", indicating that they are aimed at an audience of both girls and boys. For magazines that do not correspond to one of the five demographics, their primary genre is listed.

The following have full details on the magazine entry:

See also
List of Japanese manga magazines by circulation

References

External links
 ComiPedia: Manga Magazine Guide and Publication Encyclopedia

 
Manga magazines
Manga magazines
Comics anthologies
 
 
 
 

ja:日本の漫画雑誌
zh:日本漫畫雜誌